Solly Katz (born 13 October 1942) is a South African cricketer. He played in nine first-class matches for Eastern Province between 1961/62 and 1967/68.

See also
 List of Eastern Province representative cricketers

References

External links
 

1942 births
Living people
South African cricketers
Eastern Province cricketers
Cricketers from Port Elizabeth